Taraka is a genus of butterflies in the family Lycaenidae that inhabit the East Asian Palearctic and Indomalayan realms. It includes the species Taraka hamada,  Taraka mahanetra de Nicéville, (Peninsular Malaya, Sumatra, Thailand) and Taraka shiloi Tamai & Guo, 2001 Sichuan.

References

Funet

Miletinae
Lycaenidae genera
Taxa named by William Doherty